Bergenia ligulata (Paashaanbhed, Prashanbheda, and other spellings in Ayurveda traditional Indian medicine) is a plant belonging to the family Saxifragaceae and the genus Bergenia.  It is plant is sometimes treated as a form of Bergenia ciliata.  It is mostly found in temperate regions of the Himalayas from Kashmir to Bhutan and in Khasia hills at  altitude.

Chemical constituents 

Bergenia ligulata contains a phenolic compound bergenin, and afzelechin, a type of flavan-3-ol.

References

ligulata
Plants used in Ayurveda